The 2013 season is Global's 3rd season in the Philippines premier league, the UFL Division 1. They reached the quarterfinals of the 2013 PFF National Men's Club Championship after they lost to Ceres. They played in the 2013 AFC President's Cup after they top the previously concluded 2012 season, however they were eliminated after finishing third in Group B. Global also competed in the 2013 Singapore Cup, winning the last three matches, which booked them to the semifinals. Likewise, they will also compete in the 2013 UFL Cup.

They signed the service of Brian Reid for the preparation in the President's Cup and after the end of caretakers role of Dan Palami.

The club finished the 2013 season of the UFL Division 1 second behind the champions, Stallion Sta. Lucia.

Squad

League Squad

AFC President's Cup Squad

Singapore Cup Squad

Transfers

In

Out

Loan In

Loan out

Competitions

Overview

UFL Division 1

League table

Matches

2013 UFL Cup

Preseason

PFF National Men's Club Championship

Singapore Cup

AFC President's Cup

Group B

Squad statistics
As of July 27, 2013

References

United Football League
Global Makati F.C. seasons